Loikaw Township is a township of Loikaw District in the eastern part of Kayah State in Myanmar. The principal town lies at Loikaw.

Demographics

2014

The 2014 Myanmar Census reported that Loikaw Township had a population of 128,401. The population density was 82.9 people per km2. The census reported that the median age was 24.5 years, and 97 males per 100 females. There were 26,495 households; the mean household size was 4.6.

References

Townships of Kayah State